The Atlantic Flyway is a major north-south flyway for migratory birds in North America. The route generally starts in Greenland, then follows the Atlantic coast of Canada, then south down the Atlantic Coast of the United States to the tropical areas of South America and the Caribbean.  Every year, migratory birds travel up and down this route following food sources, heading to breeding grounds, or traveling to overwintering sites.

This route is used by birds typically because no mountains block most of this path, though birds cross the northern, central and southern Appalachians to join the flyway. Good sources of water, food, and cover exist over its entire length. The warm climates found in the southern portion of the region are home to many northern birds in winter, while in summer the region is home to many bird species from South America.

Land located within the Atlantic Flyway is the most densely populated land out of the four major flyways crossing the United States.

Notable locations
Along the Atlantic Flyway, there are many key sites that migratory birds use to gather to breed, feed, or rest for certain periods. Some species may remain in these rest stops for the entire season, but most continue to move on. Notable locations include:

Canada
 Great Plain of the Koukdjuak, Nunavut
 Shepody Bay West, New Brunswick

United States
 Acadia National Park, Maine. The park preserves about half of Mount Desert Island, many adjacent smaller islands, and part of the Schoodic Peninsula on the coast of Maine. A total of 215 bird species, including migratory birds, are present at some time during the year. An additional 116 species are possibly present but unconfirmed, making a total of 331 potential species.
 Assateague Island National Seashore, Maryland and Virginia. Protected area on a long barrier island off the coast of Maryland and Virginia. It is known for its Atlantic beaches and for trails that wind through marshland, dunes and pine forest. In the south, Chincoteague National Wildlife Refuge is home to wild Chincoteague ponies, bald eagles and thousands of migratory seabirds.
Blackwater National Wildlife Refuge, Maryland's Eastern Shore. The refuge includes over 30,000 acres of tidal marsh, managed freshwater wetlands, mixed hardwood and loblolly pine forests, and croplands. It hosts over 250 bird species and serves as an important resting and feeding site for migrating and wintering waterfowl, including more than 35,000 Canada geese and 15,000 ducks using the Atlantic Flyway during the fall migration. The refuge is home to one of the highest concentrations of nesting bald eagles on the Atlantic coast.
 Cape Cod National Seashore, Massachusetts. Migratory birds can be found along the 40 miles of public beach and sand dunes. 
 Cape Hatteras National Seashore, North Carolina. Cape Hatteras is a wind-swept barrier islands along the North Carolina coast, much of it protected from development. The 75-miles of towering sand dunes, marsh, and forests provide great bird viewing year-round. 
 Cape Romain National Wildlife Refuge, South Carolina. Cape Romain features over 293 species of birds recorded on the refuge, birdwatching opportunities are excellent year-round. During spring and fall, migratory shorebirds, songbirds and raptors move through the refuge. 
 Delaware Bay, Delaware. This massive bay has been recognized as a globally important bird area. Foremost among these bird-watching paradises is Bombay Hook National Wildlife Refuge along the Delaware Bay, recognized as one of America's Top 100 “Important Birding Areas” by the American Bird Conservancy. Just to the north in the middle of the Delaware River, Pea Patch Island is home to one of the largest and most diverse heronries on the East Coast, boasting nesting pairs of Great Blue Herons, Great Egrets, Snowy Egrets, and many more colorful varieties.
 Jekyll Island, Georgia. Habitat types include salt marsh, sand dune/beach, maritime forest, and tidal creeks, which host many different species of bird.
 Merritt Island National Wildlife Refuge, Florida. Merritt Island NWR is one of the top birding sites along the Florida Atlantic coast. In winter, waterfowl and American Coots are abundant here; this is also a good site for Northern Pintails, Eurasian Widgeons, and Cinnamon Teal. One of the most interesting parts of the refuge is a one-way driving loop. The Blackpoint Wildlife Drive features wading birds, waterfowl, shorebirds, gulls, terns, raptors, American White Pelicans, and Brown Pelicans, among others.
 Montezuma National Wildlife Refuge, New York. The 10,004-acre (40.48 km2) preserve is composed of swamps, pools and channels and is a stopping point for many migratory marsh and water birds including the great blue heron, green heron, great egret, black-crowned night heron, Virginia rail, sora, bitterns, common moorhen and pied-billed grebes.
 Dry Tortugas National Park, Florida
 J.N. "Ding" Darling National Wildlife Refuge, Florida

Other flyways
The other primary migration routes for North American birds include the Mississippi, Central and Pacific Flyways.

There is an East Atlantic Flyway in Europe, and one in the Atlantic Ocean.

References

External links 
 Atlantic Americas Flyway Factsheet from BirdLife International
 Atlantic Flyway (Audubon)
 North American Migration Flyways via Wayback Machine (birdnature.com)
 Waterfowl management (Flyways.us)
 Shorebirds (atlanticflywayshorebirds.org)

Bird migration flyways